Degenkolb is a German surname. Notable people with the surname include:

Carl Degenkolb (1796–1862), German industrialist
Henry J. Degenkolb (1913–1989), American structural engineer
John Degenkolb (born 1989), German cyclist

German-language surnames
Surnames from given names